Borriello is an Italian surname. Notable people with the surname include:

Fabio Borriello (born 1985), Italian footballer
Gaetano Borriello (1958–2015), American computer scientist
Marco Borriello (born 1982), Italian footballer
Michelangelo Borriello (1909–1995), Italian sport shooter

Italian-language surnames